Adolfo Aristarain (born October 19, 1943) is an  Argentine film director and screenwriter who is famous for his filmic sophistication and subtle examination of issues of political oppression. Variety has deemed him "a master filmmaker."

Biography 
Aristarain was born in Buenos Aires.  After leaving Argentina, he started working as assistant director in the Arcente cinema, and then in Europe during his short exile for Mario Camus, Giorgio Stegani and Lewis Gilbert before returning to Argentina in 1974, following the death of Argentine president Juan Perón. His first 3 films did not receive favorable reviews, but in 1981 Tiempo de revancha received both critical acclaim and public success. Released in the midst of the so-called Guerra Sucia ("Dirty War") when Argentina was ruled by a military dictatorship, the film had strong political undercurrents but faced few problems from censors. As Aristarain would later explain, he initially included long, unnecessary sex scenes in the film, "so the censors took five days and questioned things—not politics or ideology but sex. All I had to do was cut a few frames at the end of some scenes, like one of a strip tease. It doesn't hurt the scenes—especially if you made them longer than they should have been."

Back in Spain he directed a mini-series for television, and after a series of aborted projects he had renewed success in Argentina: Un Lugar en el Mundo, starring Federico Luppi, with whom he has maintained frequent collaboration. He then filmed La Ley de la frontera and Martín (hache) in Spain, also starring Luppi. Aristarain continued with his Argentine-Spanish mixture of actors in Lugares comunes and Roma.

Aristarain wrote all the scripts of his directed movies with the exception of the Columbia Pictures release The Stranger, which was written by American screenwriter Dan Gurskis.

He has received numerous awards for his work, including Golden Seashell and an Academy Award nomination for Un Lugar en el mundo, Best Director award at the Havana Film Festival, and Golden Seashell nomination  for Martín (Hache), the First Prize at the Havana Film Festival and the Grand Prix des Amériques award at the Montréal World Film Festival for Tiempo de revancha.

The Academy Award Nomination was disqualified by the Academy of Motion Picture Arts and Sciences because the film was submitted for consideration (for Best Foreign Movie) by Uruguay (his wife's country) while The Academy claimed it was an Argentine production, and should therefore have been submitted by that country.

Aristarain has worked many times with several, notable actors, such as Federico Luppi (7 times), Julio de Grazia (4 times), Cecilia Roth (3 times), Ricardo Darín (3 times) and Ulises Dumont (2 times). He has held Spanish Citizenship since 2003.

Filmography 
 La parte del león (1978)
 La playa del amor (1979)
 La discoteca del amor (1980)
 Tiempo de revancha (1981)
 Últimos días de la víctima (1982)
 The Stranger (1987)
 Un lugar en el mundo (1991)
 La Ley de la frontera (1995)
 Martín (hache) (1997)
 Lugares comunes (2002)
 Roma (2004)

Awards and nominations

References

External links 
 
 Biography Pantalla 
 Interview to Adolfo Aristarain Diagonal 

1943 births
Living people
People from Buenos Aires
Argentine film directors
Naturalised citizens of Spain